Lacordaire Academy is a Catholic college preparatory school  with a coeducational prekindergarten to eighth grade and an all girls ninth through twelfth grade student body.  The Academy was established by the Sisters of St. Dominic of Caldwell, New Jersey. The school is located in the Upper Montclair section of Montclair, in Essex County, New Jersey, United States.

Lacordaire Academy has been accredited by the New Jersey Department of Education and the Middle States Association of Colleges and Schools Commission on Elementary and Secondary Schools since 1951 and is accredited through January 2025. The school is a member of the New Jersey Association of Independent Schools and is located within the Roman Catholic Archdiocese of Newark.

As of the 2019–20 school year, the school had an enrollment of 225 students (plus 15 in PreK) and 32.4 classroom teachers (on an FTE basis), for a student–teacher ratio of 6.9:1. The school's student body was 50.2% (113) White, 23.1% (52) Black, 11.1% (25) two or more races, 10.7% (24) Hispanic and 4.9% (11) Asian.

The school was founded in 1920, and named for Pere Henri Lacordaire, a Dominican priest who lived in post-revolution Paris.

Activities
Lacordaire Academy provides many clubs and organizations that students can join based on their own interests and availability. At Lacordaire, a student can create any club that she desires as long as they find a moderator and people to join.

Leadership
 Dominican Preachers
 National Honor Society
 Student Ambassadors
 Student Council

Athletics
The Lacordaire Lions compete in interscholastic sports under the supervision of the New Jersey State Interscholastic Athletic Association competing on an independent basis.

Sports offered include:
 Tennis
 Volleyball
 Soccer
 Basketball
 Softball

A runner from the school was the Non-Public B individual champion in 2002.

Literary
 The Checkerboard (Newspaper)
 Veritas (Yearbook)
 Zephyr (Literary Magazine)
 Laco Ledger (Middle School)

Clubs
 Multicultural Club
 Mission Club
 Environmental Club
 Mock Trial
 Forensics
 Drama Club
 Lego Club
 L.A.C.O Service Club
 Peer Tutoring
 Feminist Club
 Couch to 5k
 Chorus 
 Science Mentors 
 Chess Club
 Harry Potter Club 
 Poetry Out Loud 
 Sports Club

Graduation requirements
All Upper School students follow a college preparatory program.  All requirements must be fulfilled or substituted with a course of equal value.
Required:
6 full-year electives
4 years Religious Studies
4 years English
4 years Comprehensive Health/Physical Education
3 years Mathematics
3 years Foreign Language
4 years Science
2 years United States History
1 year World History
1 year Fine Arts
1 year Computer Science
1 semester Project Justice Internship

Notable alumni
 Elizabeth McAlister (born 1939), peace activist and former nun of the Religious of the Sacred Heart of Mary.

References

External links
School website
Data for Lacordaire Academy, National Center for Education Statistics

1920 establishments in New Jersey
Educational institutions established in 1920
Girls' schools in New Jersey
New Jersey Association of Independent Schools
Private high schools in Essex County, New Jersey
Catholic secondary schools in New Jersey
Private K-12 schools in New Jersey
Roman Catholic Archdiocese of Newark
Upper Montclair, New Jersey